Istočni Mostar is a municipality located in Republika Srpska, an entity of Bosnia and Herzegovina. As of 2013, it has a population of 257 inhabitants.

History
Istočni Mostar was created in 1995, following the end of the Bosnian War. It was known as Srpski Mostar until 2004, after which it was renamed to its current name Istočni Mostar. It was created from the Serb-inhabited part of the pre-war municipality of Mostar which is now in the Herzegovina-Neretva Canton, Federation of Bosnia and Herzegovina.

The seat of municipality is in Zijemlje, with 187 inhabitants, most of whom are Serbs. The two other settlements are Kamena and Kokorina.

As of 2019, it is one of the smallest municipalities by number of inhabitants in Republika Srpska.

Demographics

Population

Ethnic composition

Notable people

 Želimir Puljić (born 1947), Croatian Catholic archbishop

References

External links

 
Municipalities of Republika Srpska